SWNS Media Group (also known as South West News Service) is a British news agency and media company with six subdivisions, including SWNS, 72point, InsideMedia, OATH, OnePoll and Talk to the Press. 

The company operates from offices in Bristol, Plymouth, Leeds, Solihull, Glasgow, Aberdeen, Cambridge and London. As of 2015, SWNS employed around 100 reporters and photographers.

History
It was founded as the Bristol Agency in the early 1970s. It is now run by partners Andrew Young, Paul Walters and Martin Winter.

In 2010 SWNS launched the website SWNS.com (Small World News Service) as a first hand source of current affairs and general interest news.

In 2016 SWNS acquired the regional agencies Masons News Service, Newsteam International, Ross Parry, National News, Centre Press and Northscot.

Organisation

SWNS has two public relations divisions: 72Point and Inside Media, market research company OnePoll, also OATH and Talk to The Press.

SWNS has a relationship with the alternative news website venture The London Economic, though it is understood not to leverage any editorial control.

References

External links
 

Mass media companies of the United Kingdom
News agencies based in the United Kingdom
Companies based in Bristol
Mass media companies established in 1978